Raymond Mayers (born 8 January 1960) is an Australian water polo player who competed in the 1984 Summer Olympics, in the 1988 Summer Olympics, and in the 1992 Summer Olympics.

References

1960 births
Living people
Australian male water polo players
Olympic water polo players of Australia
Water polo players at the 1984 Summer Olympics
Water polo players at the 1988 Summer Olympics
Water polo players at the 1992 Summer Olympics